Migliorismo, or meliorism, was a tendency within the Italian Communist Party. Its leader was Giorgio Napolitano, and it counted among its number Gerardo Chiaromonte and Emanuele Macaluso. It was also referred to as the "right wing" of the Italian Communist Party, due to the relatively moderate and reformist views of its adherents.

Origins
The name migliorismo derives from the Italian verb migliorare ("to improve", which is the root of the English word ameliorate), because its main goal was to improve the Italian capitalist system from the inside, by means of gradual reforms, according to a social democratic programme rather than full-scale revolution. Its origins lay in the ideas of Giorgio Amendola, a prominent PCI leader during the post-World War II period, who discussed gradually abandoning Marxism in favour of social democratic and reformist theories. 

These ideas were suited for making alliances with more moderate centre-left parties, such as the Italian Socialist Party (PSI) and the Italian Social Democratic Party (PSDI). Consequently, migliorismo received extensive derogatory treatment from the revolutionary left wing of the PCI, which was led by Pietro Ingrao. The miglioristi did, however, receive some modest support from the pro-Soviet wing of the party in the days when it was headed by Armando Cossutta.
 
During the early 1980s there were frequent conflicts between the secretary of the Communist Party Enrico Berlinguer and the exponents of migliorismo, who criticized Berlinguer's renunciation of the historic compromise and his ongoing hostility to Bettino Craxi, the leader of the PSI. The miglioristi believed that the party had allowed Craxi to monopolize the concept of 'modernization' in politics (Craxismo), thereby leaving it unable to properly interpret the social and economic changes that had occurred in Italy. According to some critics, Craxi used the miglioristi as a tool to hamper Berlinguer.

Several representatives of the migliorista wing of the Democratic Party of the Left (PDS), born in 1991 from the ashes of the PCI, criticized Secretary Achille Occhetto's decision to support the prosecutors investigating the numerous corruption scandals that arose during the Tangentopoli crisis, which they attacked as "judicialist". Some of the Milanese exponents of migliorismo, who were often close to the PSI, were later arrested for corruption, although most of them were released without charge.

Migliorismo today
Most former miglioristi, including Napolitano, joined the Democrats of the Left, where they became associated with the positions of Piero Fassino and especially Enrico Morando. Il Riformista, a left-oriented Italian newspaper, is a publication whose ideas are close to those of migliorismo.

Some ex-PCI miglioristi, including Massimo Ferlini, Lodovico Festa and Sandro Bondi, joined Silvio Berlusconi's party Forza Italia upon its foundation.

Notable miglioristi
Giorgio Napolitano
Giorgio Amendola
Emanuele Macaluso
Gerardo Chiaromonte
Nilde Iotti
Giancarlo Pajetta
Luciano Lama

Political history of Italy
Social democracy
Political party factions in Italy